Nordheim Independent School District is a public independent school district based in Nordheim, Texas (USA).

Located in DeWitt County, a small portion of the district extends into Karnes County.

Nordheim ISD has one school that serves students in grades kindergarten through twelve.

In 2010, the school district was rated "exemplary" by the Texas Education Agency.

Schools
 Nordheim High School

References

External links
 

School districts in DeWitt County, Texas
School districts in Karnes County, Texas